Jomlo Bari is a small village reside at West Siang District, Arunachal Pradesh.

See also
 West Siang
 Along

Notes
The Kebang is the main supreme social council and a court in the village.
The Head Goan Bura is the supreme presidential member of the village.
Law and order in the village is being handled by the Goan Buras of the village.
The students' union wing in the village is known as All Jomlo Bari Students' Union.
The Dere is the main cultural stage as well as supreme platform of the village.

References

Villages in West Siang district